Get out the vote, or GOTV, is the effort of a political campaign to increase voter participation.

GOTV may also refer to:
GoTV Networks, a mobile content company
Gathering of the Vibes, a music festival
GoTV (Austrian channel), an Austrian music channel
Counter Strike: Global Offensive TV, is a system used so players that do not participate in a game are allowed to watch the game progress
GOtv Africa, a digital terrestrial television platform operated by MultiChoice that broadcasts in 11 African countries